Frank DiMaggio (born May 1, 1950) is a retired Canadian football player who played for the Ottawa Rough Riders. He played college football at Temple University.

References

1950 births
Living people
Ottawa Rough Riders players